Rosa spithamea is a species of rose known by the common names ground rose and coast ground rose. It is native to Oregon and California, where it grows in forest and chaparral habitats, especially areas recently burned.

Description
Rosa spithamea is a small perennial shrub growing no taller than about half a meter. The stem is studded with a few or many prickles. The glandular leaves are each made up of several double-toothed oval leaflets, the terminal leaflet up to 3 centimeters long. The inflorescence is a cyme of up to 10 flowers with pink petals each up to 1.5 centimeters in length. The fruit is a rose hip about a centimeter wide and scarlet in color.

References

External links
Jepson Manual Treatment - Rosa spithamea
Rosa spithamea - Photo gallery

spithamea
Flora of California
Flora of Oregon
Natural history of the California chaparral and woodlands
Natural history of the California Coast Ranges
Natural history of the San Francisco Bay Area
Bird food plants
Flora without expected TNC conservation status